Gerry Herman Kisters (March 2, 1919 – May 11, 1986) was a United States Army soldier and a recipient of the United States military's highest decoration—the Medal of Honor—for his actions in World War II.

Biography
Kisters was born in Salt Lake City, Utah to a family that had worked in the fur trade for generations; his family moved to Bloomington, Indiana in 1937, where his father opened a fur shop. Kisters worked for his father and then opened his own fur shop in Vincennes, Indiana, operating it for several years before he was drafted in January 1941. He was assigned to a reconnaissance unit training at Fort Bliss, Texas.

By 1942 Kisters' unit, formerly attached to the 1st Cavalry, had become an independent unit, the 91st Cavalry Reconnaissance Squadron. At the end of 1942 they were sent to Casablanca to join the Tunisian campaign. On May 7, 1943 Kisters, now a staff sergeant, surprised and killed the crew of a German 88 mm artillery gun, earning a Distinguished Service Cross, the citation for which reads:

By July 31, 1943 Kisters' unit was attached to the 2nd Armored Division, then involved in the Allied invasion of Sicily. On that day, near Gagliano, Sicily, he and an officer captured an enemy machine gun position. Kisters then went forward alone and, although wounded in both legs and his right arm on his approach, single-handedly captured a second machine gun emplacement. He was subsequently promoted to second lieutenant and, on February 18, 1944, was awarded his Distinguished Service Cross and the Medal of Honor. He was the first American soldier to be awarded both during World War II. He was featured in war bond drives and the Monroe County Airport was named Kisters Field in his honor.

Kisters was sent back to the U.S. and spent months recovering from his injuries. After his recovery he taught reconnaissance at Fort Riley, Kansas and reached the rank of first lieutenant. After the war he reopened his fur shop and became a successful businessman.

He died at age 67 and was buried at Rose Hill Cemetery in Bloomington, Indiana.

Medal of Honor citation
Kisters' official Medal of Honor citation reads:
On 31 July 1943, near Gagliano, Sicily, a detachment of 1 officer and 9 enlisted men, including Sgt. Kisters, advancing ahead of the leading elements of U.S. troops to fill a large crater in the only available vehicle route through Gagliano, was taken under fire by 2 enemy machineguns. Sgt. Kisters and the officer, unaided and in the face of intense small arms fire, advanced on the nearest machinegun emplacement and succeeded in capturing the gun and its crew of 4. Although the greater part of the remaining small arms fire was now directed on the captured machinegun position, Sgt. Kisters voluntarily advanced alone toward the second gun emplacement. While creeping forward, he was struck 5 times by enemy bullets, receiving wounds in both legs and his right arm. Despite the wounds, he continued to advance on the enemy, and captured the second machinegun after killing 3 of its crew and forcing the fourth member to flee. The courage of this soldier and his unhesitating willingness to sacrifice his life, if necessary, served as an inspiration to the command.

See also

List of Medal of Honor recipients
List of Medal of Honor recipients for World War II

References

1919 births
1986 deaths
United States Army personnel of World War II
United States Army Medal of Honor recipients
People from Bloomington, Indiana
United States Army officers
Recipients of the Distinguished Service Cross (United States)
World War II recipients of the Medal of Honor
Military personnel from Salt Lake City
Burials in Indiana